Phoo Sar Lan Sone is a 1969 Burmese black-and-white drama film, directed by Bo Ba Ko starring Kyaw Hein, Sandar, Bo Ba Ko, San Shar Tin and Baby Nwet.

Cast
Kyaw Hein
Sandar
Bo Ba Ko
San Shar Tin
Baby Nwet

References

1969 films
1960s Burmese-language films
Films shot in Myanmar
Burmese black-and-white films
1969 drama films
Burmese drama films